Xantusia sierrae, the Sierra night lizard, is a species of lizard in the family Xantusiidae. It is a small lizard found in California.

References

Xantusia
Reptiles of the United States
Endemic fauna of California
Reptiles described in 1967
Taxa named by Robert L. Bezy
Fauna without expected TNC conservation status